The 300 Year Weekend is a 1971 drama film starring William Devane.

The film was given several test engagements in February 1971 but was not released.

Plot

Cast
 William Devane as Tom
 Michael Tolan as Dr. Marshall 
 Sharon Laughlin as Nancy 
 Roy Cooper as Hal 
 Gabriel Dell as Wynter

References

External links

1971 films
Universal Pictures films
1971 drama films
ABC Motion Pictures films
1970s English-language films